Cristian López Santamaría (born 27 April 1989), known simply as Cristian, is a Spanish professional footballer who plays as a forward for CD Eldense.

Club career

Alicante
Born in Crevillent, Alicante, Valencian Community, Cristian played for several clubs as a youth, including local Crevillente Deportivo and Alicante CF. He made his debut for the latter's first team during the 2007–08 season, as they returned to Segunda División after a 50-year absence.

In the following campaign, Cristian continued playing mostly with the reserves in Tercera División, with the main squad finally being relegated. He made his division two debut in a game against Hércules CF on 6 June 2009, scoring in a 1–2 local derby home loss.

Castilla and Mestalla
López signed for Real Madrid Castilla in the summer of 2009, with Real Madrid's reserves in the third division. He finished his first year with ten goals – second-best in the squad – as the team finished eighth in the league.

In January 2011, Cristian signed for Valencia CF's B team in the fourth level, in a season-long loan. He scored in double digits as the Che reserves returned to the third tier at the first attempt, and the move was made permanent in the summer. He added a further 11 goals the following campaign, including all of his team's goals on 13 May 2012 as they won 4–2 at UE Sant Andreu.

Cristian spent 2012–13 still in division three, with CD Atlético Baleares. He ranked top scorer for the Palma de Mallorca-based side, scoring twice on 31 March 2013 in a 3–0 home win over city rivals RCD Mallorca B.

Huddersfield
On 24 July 2013, trialist Cristian played for Huddersfield Town against Real Betis, in a 4–2 friendly loss at the John Smith's Stadium, and he scored in the next pre-season match with Oldham Athletic (3–2 defeat). The following week he signed a one-year deal with the Terriers, taking the number 19 shirt vacated by Alan Lee.

Cristian made his Football League Championship on 3 August 2013, coming on as a substitute in a 1–0 defeat at Nottingham Forest – in the process, he became the club's first ever Spanish player in its 105-year history. On 10 October, however, he joined Football League One side Shrewsbury Town on a month's loan, becoming the first Spaniard to sign for the club. He scored his first goal for the team and in English football on the 22nd, in a 1–1 draw against Colchester United at the New Meadow, but returned to Huddersfield on 5 November following an injury crisis to its attacking sector.

On 14 March 2014, López moved to League Two's Northampton Town, on loan for the rest of the season. He was released by Huddersfield in May.

Burgos and CFR Cluj
On 17 July 2014, Cristian joined Burgos CF in the third tier, eventually helping his team to a mid-table finish. He received a straight red card on 11 October 2014 in a goalless draw at CD Guijuelo, for a 15th-minute high challenge on Juli Ferrer.

Cristian moved abroad for the second time in June 2015, signing with Romanian Liga I team CFR Cluj. He made his top-flight debut on 11 July, replacing Guima for the final 20 minutes of a 2–2 draw at FC Viitorul Constanța in the opening game of the season. A month later, he scored his first goal for the Feroviarii, the game's only at the Stadionul Dr. Constantin Rădulescu against FC Petrolul Ploiești, four minutes after coming on for Leo Beleck.

On 31 August 2015, Cristian recorded a hat-trick in a 3–1 home win over FC Botoșani. The following 17 May, in the final of the Cupa României, he came on at half-time for Tomislav Gomelt and headed a last-minute equaliser as CFR came from behind to draw 2–2 against FC Dinamo București before winning in a penalty shootout.

Lens

Cristian switched countries again on 31 August 2016, when he joined Ligue 2 club RC Lens on a one-year deal with the option for a second. He made his debut nine days later, replacing Kévin Fortuné for the final ten minutes of a 1–1 home draw with FC Bourg-Pérronas, and scored his first goal on 20 September in a 4–2 victory over US Orléans also at the Stade Bollaert-Delelis. The team finished in fourth, one point off promotion, and he was joint-third amongst scorers with 16 goals.

Cristian scored eight times in the first half of the 2017–18 season. He then embarked on a drought which lasted until the final two fixtures against Tours FC and AJ Auxerre, and fans petitioned for him to be given a new contract.

Angers
On 31 August 2018, the last day of the 2018 summer transfer window, free agent Cristian signed a one-year contract with Angers SCO. His maiden appearance in Ligue 1 took place on 6 October, when he played the last eight minutes of a 2–2 home draw to RC Strasbourg Alsace. He scored his first goal late in same month, but in a 1–2 loss against Olympique Lyonnais.

Hatta and Las Palmas
On 19 August 2019, Cristian agreed to a one-year deal at UAE Pro-League's Hatta Club. The following 1 March, he signed with Spanish second division team UD Las Palmas for the rest of the season with the option of one more.

Aris
Cristian signed a two-year contract with Aris Thessaloniki F.C. on 26 August 2020. He scored in his Super League Greece debut, equalising against PAS Lamia 1964 in an eventual 3–1 home win.

On 1 February 2021, Cristian joined FC Cartagena on loan until 30 June.

Career statistics

Honours
Valencia B
Tercera División: 2010–11

CFR Cluj
Cupa României: 2015–16

References

External links

1989 births
Living people
People from Crevillent
Sportspeople from the Province of Alicante
Spanish footballers
Footballers from the Valencian Community
Association football forwards
Segunda División players
Segunda División B players
Tercera División players
Primera Federación players
Crevillente Deportivo players
Alicante CF footballers
Real Madrid Castilla footballers
Valencia CF Mestalla footballers
CD Atlético Baleares footballers
Burgos CF footballers
UD Las Palmas players
FC Cartagena footballers
CD Eldense footballers
English Football League players
Huddersfield Town A.F.C. players
Shrewsbury Town F.C. players
Northampton Town F.C. players
Liga I players
CFR Cluj players
Ligue 1 players
Ligue 2 players
RC Lens players
Angers SCO players
UAE Pro League players
Hatta Club players
Super League Greece players
Aris Thessaloniki F.C. players
Spanish expatriate footballers
Expatriate footballers in England
Expatriate footballers in Romania
Expatriate footballers in France
Expatriate footballers in the United Arab Emirates
Expatriate footballers in Greece
Spanish expatriate sportspeople in England
Spanish expatriate sportspeople in Romania
Spanish expatriate sportspeople in France
Spanish expatriate sportspeople in the United Arab Emirates
Spanish expatriate sportspeople in Greece